Burden Ironworks Office Building is a historic office building located in Troy, Rensselaer County, New York.  It was built about 1880 and is a one-story, brick building laid out in a cruciform plan.  It features gabled and hipped roofs and a central octagonal cupola and onion dome.

It was listed on the National Register of Historic Places in 1972.

Gallery

References

External links

Office buildings on the National Register of Historic Places in New York (state)
Historic American Engineering Record in New York (state)
Commercial buildings completed in 1880
Buildings and structures in Rensselaer County, New York
1880 establishments in New York (state)
National Register of Historic Places in Troy, New York